Peach Bottom Atomic Power Station, a nuclear power plant, is located  southeast of Harrisburg in Peach Bottom Township, York County, Pennsylvania, on the Susquehanna River three miles north of the Maryland border.

The Philadelphia Electric Company (later "PECO") was a pioneer in the commercial nuclear industry when it ordered Peach Bottom 1 in 1958.  The U.S.'s first nuclear power plant (the Shippingport Reactor) had gone on line a year earlier.  Peach Bottom Unit 1 was an experimental helium-cooled, graphite-moderated reactor. It operated from 1966 to 1974.  Peach Bottom 2 and 3, General Electric boiling water reactors, went on-line in 1974, and are still in operation on the 620-acre (2.5 km2) site today.  Both Units 2 and 3, originally rated at 3,514 megawatts thermal (MWth), equivalent to about 1,180 megawatts of electricity (MWe) each, were uprated to 4,016 megawatts thermal (MWth), equivalent to about 1,382 megawatts net of electricity (MWe) each in 2018. Units 2 and 3 were originally licensed to operate until 2013 and 2014, respectively.  Their licenses were extended until 2033 and 2034 and then, in 2020 they were extended to 2053 and 2054.

Peach Bottom is currently operated by Constellation Energy (formerly a division of PECO's parent company, Exelon, and before that it was known as Baltimore Electric and Gas, the oldest gas utility in the country) and is jointly owned by Constellation (50%) and Public Service Enterprise Group (PSEG) Power LLC (formerly Public Service Electric and Gas) (50%).

Peach Bottom was one of the plants analyzed in the NUREG-1150 safety analysis study.

Electricity Production

Surrounding population

The 2010 U.S. population within  of Peach Bottom was 46,536, an increase of 7.2 percent in a decade, according to an analysis of U.S. Census data for msnbc.com. The 2010 U.S. population within  was 5,526,343, an increase of 10.6 percent since 2000. Cities within 50 miles include Baltimore (36 miles to city center).

Safety concerns
In 1987, PECO was ordered by the Nuclear Regulatory Commission (NRC) to indefinitely shutdown Peach Bottom-2 and -3 on March 31 due to operator misconduct, corporate malfeasance, and blatant disregard for the health and safety of the area. .

Among the incidents cited by the NRC: security guards were overworked, one guard was found asleep on the job, 36,000 gallons of "mildly radioactive water" leaked into the Susquehanna River, PECO mislaid data on radioactive waste classification causing misclassification of a waste shipment, and a major fire occurred in the maintenance cage of the Unit 3 turbine building on March 4, 1987.

Blame was not simply placed on the operators. "Latent organizational weakness" was targeted by industry experts and regulators alike. INPO President Zack Pate came to the conclusion that "Major changes in the corporate culture at PECO are required." In September 1988, NRC Chairman Lando Zech told senior management officials of PECO, "Your operators certainly made mistakes, no question about that. Your corporate management problems are just as serious." Clearly, a culture characterized by low morale and apathy prevailed. By April 1988, this emphasis on mismanagement contributed to the President of PECO resigning as well as to the retirement of the CEO.

Robert P. Crosby became the primary Organization Development influence during the PECO Nuclear turnaround following the Peach Bottom shut down. He used The Interpersonal Gap model by John L. Wallen along with a unique T-group method known as Conflict Management (and later as Tough Stuff in other business applications) to speed culture change, and applied his own version of Daryl Conner's Sponsor Agent Target model to improving and shortening outage management.

By 1996, both Limerick and Peach Bottom were designated excellent by INPO, and given strong Systematic Assessment of Licensee Performance (SALP) ratings by the NRC.

In 1999, PECO Nuclear eliminated their Organization Development positions as part of cost cutting initiative.
 
Trouble arose again in September 2007, when former employee Kerry Beal videotaped Peach Bottom security guards sleeping on the job. Beal had previously tried to notify supervisors at Wackenhut Corp. and the US Nuclear Regulatory Commission. He was eventually fired during the Exelon security transition, a decision which made a list of the 101 "dumbest moments in business" in the January 16, 2008 issue of Fortune.

Seismic risk
The Nuclear Regulatory Commission's estimate of the risk each year of an earthquake intense enough to cause core damage to the reactor at Peach Bottom was 1 in 41,667; according to an NRC study published in August 2010.

See also

 Exelon
 Nuclear reactor accidents in the United States
 Nuclear safety in the United States
 G4S Secure Solutions (formerly The Wackenhut Corporation)
 List of the largest nuclear power stations in the United States

References
Specific

General
https://www.nrc.gov/info-finder/decommissioning/power-reactor/peach-bottom-atomic-power-station-unit.html

External links

 

Energy infrastructure completed in 1966
Energy infrastructure completed in 1974
Nuclear safety and security
Buildings and structures in York County, Pennsylvania
Nuclear power plants in Pennsylvania
Exelon
Public Service Enterprise Group